Hu Juewen (October 7, 1895 – April 16, 1989) was a Chinese male politician, who served as the vice chairperson of the Standing Committee of the National People's Congress.

References 

1895 births
1989 deaths
Vice Chairpersons of the National People's Congress